The 2005 Teen Choice Awards ceremony was held on August 16, 2005, at the Gibson Amphitheatre, Universal City, California. The awards celebrate the year's achievements in music, film, television, sports, fashion, comedy, video games, and the Internet, and were voted on by viewers living in the US, aged 13 and over through various social media sites. The event was hosted by Hilary Duff and Rob Schneider with Gwen Stefani, The Black Eyed Peas, The Pussycat Dolls and Simple Plan as performers. Stefani received the Visionary Award.

Performers
Gwen Stefani – "Hollaback Girl"
The Black Eyed Peas – "Don't Phunk with My Heart"
The Pussycat Dolls – "Don't Cha"
Simple Plan – "Untitled (How Could This Happen to Me?)"

Presenters

Amanda Bynes
Amber Tamblyn
Anna Kournikova
Ashlee Simpson
Chingy
David Boreanaz
David Spade
Debra Jo Rupp
Emma Roberts
Eva Longoria
Eva Mendes
Frankie J
Halle Berry
Hayden Panettiere
Hilarie Burton
Hulk Hogan
Jesse McCartney
Jessica Alba
John Cena
JoJo
Kristen Bell
Marlon Wayans
Mischa Barton
Nick Cannon
Raven
Regina King
Reunion cast
Richard Rubin
Ryan Cabrera
Ryan Reynolds
Ryan Seacrest
Shannon Elizabeth
Shawn Wayans
The Gotti Brothers
Tyler Hilton
Wilmer Valderrama

Winners and nominees
Winners are listed first and highlighted in bold text.

Movies
Reference:

Television

Music

People

Sports

Miscellaneous

References

Teen Choice Awards
2005 awards
2005 in American music
2005 in California
2000s in Los Angeles